The Dalaman River (Dalaman çayı) or "Dalaman Stream" is a river in the Mediterranean Region of Turkey, emptying into the Mediterranean Sea on the southwestern coast of Turkey, in the Muğla Province.  The river forms much of the western border of the Dalaman district, where its neighbors are Köyceğiz and Ortaca districts.

It was known as the River Indus in classical antiquity  

It should not be confused with the Indus, the great river of Asia, which was also known in antiquity.

References

Rivers of Turkey